Marmara Ereğlisi LNG Storage Facility is an above-ground liquefied natural gas (LNG) tanks facility in Tekirdağ Province, northwestern Turkey.

It is part of an LNG terminal operated by the  state-owned natural gas distributor BOTAŞ, where LNG carriers at a discharge port pump the imported cargo ashore. LNG is stored in tanks and regasified to convey to the main pipeline system as needed.

The project for the construction of the LNG storage facility launched in 1984. The facility went into service in August 1994. In 2007, six filling platforms were added for tank trucks having  capacity. Three filling platforms are able to fill up daily 75 tanker trucks.

With the completion of an additional fourth storage tank in 2019, country's LNG storage capacity will increase by 30%.

See also

 Lake Tuz Natural Gas Storage,
 Northern Marmara and Değirmenköy (Silivri) Depleted Gas Reservoir,
 Egegaz Aliağa LNG Storage Facility.
 Botaş Dörtyol LNG Storage Facility

References

Natural gas storage
Energy infrastructure in Turkey
Natural gas in Turkey
1994 establishments in Turkey
Energy infrastructure completed in 1994
Buildings and structures in Tekirdağ Province
Botaş